James Kirk (12 November 1925 – July 2020) was a Scottish footballer who played as a goalkeeper in the Scottish Football League for St Mirren and in the Football League for Bury, Colchester United, Torquay United and Aldershot. He died in 2020 at the age of 94.

Career
Born in Tarbolton, Kirk began his career in Scotland with St Mirren, where he made 86 league appearances for the club, before moving to England to play for Bury, where he featured in 79 Football League matches.

Kirk joined Colchester United in 1954 and spent one season with the club, making his debut on 21 August, the opening day of the season in a 0–0 draw with Swindon Town at Layer Road. He made 32 appearances in total for the U's, playing his final game for the club on 28 April 1955 in a 2–2 home draw with Gillingham.

Kirk would then spend one season with Torquay United, making 39 league appearances before ending his Football League career by featuring five times for Aldershot. He retired from football following a spell with non-league Tonbridge Angels.

References

1925 births
2020 deaths
People from Tarbolton
Footballers from South Ayrshire
Scottish footballers
Association football goalkeepers
Annbank United F.C. players
Scottish Junior Football Association players
Scottish Football League players
St Mirren F.C. players
Bury F.C. players
Colchester United F.C. players
Torquay United F.C. players
Aldershot F.C. players
Tonbridge Angels F.C. players
English Football League players